ProSiebenSat1 Welt (styled as P7S1 Welt as of January 2020) is a German-language television channel developed for North American audiences.

The channel offers old and current programming selections from the commercial German television channels Sat.1, ProSieben, kabel eins, ProSieben Maxx, Sat.1 Gold and sixx, which are owned by ProSiebenSat.1 Media. The channel went on the air in February 2005 and is available via the satellite provider Dish Network and select cable companies, often offered as part of a German Language Package together with the public German state-owned Deutsche Welle network. ProSiebenSat1 Welt is also available in Canada through a partnership with Ethnic Channels Group.

Shows

Current Shows 

 Abenteuer Alltag – Jetzt bauen wir!
 Abenteuer Alltag – so leben wir Deutschen
 Abenteuer Leben – täglich Wissen
 Achtung Kontrolle! – Einsatz für die Ordnungshüter
 Achtung Notaufnahme
 Akte 20.17
 All About You — Das Fashion Duell
 Alpenstar TV
 Anna und die Liebe
 Anwälte im Einsatz
 Auf die Plätze! Fertig! Weg! 
 Auf Streife
 BeefBattle - Duell am Grill
 Britt – Der Talk um eins
 Das große Backen
 Der Bulle von Tölz
 Der Glücksvollzieher
 Deine Chance! 3 Bewerber – 1 Job
 Deutschlands größte Kriminalfälle
 Die 2 - Anwälte mit Herz
 Die Anstalt – Zurück ins Leben
 Die Dreisten Drei – jetzt noch dreister
 Die Ruhrpottwache
 Die Straßen von Berlin
 Die Wunderbare Welt der Tierbaby
 Do it Yourself – S.O.S.
 EDGE Action Sports World
 Einsatz in Köln - Die Kommissare
 Extreme
 Flames - Geschmack ist alles
 Follow us! Das ProSieben-Reportermagazin
 Frank: der Weddingplaner
 Freunde - Das Leben beginnt
 Galileo
 Hilfe - Ich bin pleite! Letzte Rettung Pfandleiher
 In Gefahr - Ein verhängnisvoller Moment
 Inside mit Stefan Gödde
 Inspektor Rolle
 Jetzt wird's schräg
 Kampf der Köche
 Karawane der Köche
 K1 Magazin
 K1 Reportage
 K11 – Kommissare im Einsatz
 Kiss Bang Love
 Lenßen & Partner
 Maddin in Love
 Mannsbilder
 Mein Lokal, Dein Lokal
 Mein Mann, sein Hobby und Ich
 Mein neues Leben (und: Mein neues Leben – XXL
 Mein großer dicker peinlicher Verlobter
 Messer, Gabel, herz - Das Blind-Date Dinner
 Mission Wahnsinn - Für Geld zum Held
 Niedrig und Kuhnt – Kommissare ermitteln
 Pain & Fame - Wer wird Deutschlands bester Tätowierer?
 Paula kommt - Sex und Gute Nacktgeschichten
 Patchwork Family
 Reality Affairs
 Restaurant Startup
 Rosins Restaurant
 Richter Alexander Hold
 Risky Quiz
 Sat.1 Reportage
 Schicksale - und plötzlich ist alles anders
 SK Kölsch
 Sweet & Easy - Enie backt — Das Foodmagazin
 taff
 Uncovered
 Verdächtig
 Verrückt nach Clara
 Weibsbilder
 We are Family! So lebt Deutschland
 Yvonne Willicks räumt auf
 Zieh mich an!
 Zwischen Meer und Maloche

Former Shows 

 24 Stunden – My Story
 Abenteuer Auto
 Abenteuer Natur
 Akte – Reporter decken auf
 Alles außer Sex
 alphateam – Die Lebensretter im OP
 Avenzio – Schöner leben!
 Der Bergdoktor
 Besser Essen – Leben leicht gemacht
 Bim Bam Bino
 BIZZ
 Bundesliga
 Clever! – Die Show, die Wissen schafft
 Danni Lowinski
 Darf man das?
 Edel & Starck
 Extreme Activity
 Das Fast Food-Duell
 Focus TV
 Freunde wie wir
 Galileo Mystery
 Genial daneben – Die Comedy Arena
 Der Glücksvollzieher
 GoldStar TV
 Granaten wie wir
 GSG 9 – Ihr Einsatz ist ihr Leben
 Gülcans Traumhochzeit
 Hallo, Onkel Doc!
 Hand aufs Herz
 Ein Job – Deine Chance
 Job-Duell – Die Chance deines Lebens
 Julia Leischik sucht: Bitte melde dich
 Die Jugendberaterin
 Jugendcoach Oliver Lück
 Kalkofes Mattscheibe
 Kleine Hunde — Großes Chaos
 Kurklinik Rosenau
 Ladyland
 Lebe Deinen Traum! Jetzt wird alles anders
 Der letzte Bulle
 Liebe isst – Das Single Dinner
 Lotta in Love
 Das Model und der Freak
 Ein Mord für Quandt
 N24 Nachrichten für ProSiebenSat.1 Welt
 N24 Wissen
 Nur die Liebe zählt
 Parkhotel Stern
 Popstars
 ProSieben Reportage
 Quatsch Comedy Club
 Richterin Barbara Salesch
 R.I.S. – Die Sprache der Toten
 SAM
 Schatz, mach` du mal meinen Job!
 Schillerstraße
 Sechserpack
 Sommer und Bolten: Gute Ärzte, keine Engel
 Der Staatsfeind
 Stromberg
 Studio 24
 Switch Reloaded
 Tamme Hanken - Der Knochenbrecher on tour
 TRAMITZ and friends
 TV total
 
 Verliebt in Berlin
 Der Welpentrainer 
 Wolffs Revier
 Wolkenstein
 Zacherl: Einfach kochen
 Zwei bei Kallwass

See also 

 ProSiebenSat.1 Welt Canada

References

External links 
 Official Site

Television stations in Germany
ProSiebenSat.1 Media
German-language television stations
German-language mass media in the United States
Television channels and stations established in 2005
International broadcasters